Hakimi Lebovic is a surface light rail transit (LRT) stop under construction on Line 5 Eglinton, a new line that is part of the Toronto subway system. It will be located in the Golden Mile neighbourhood at the intersection of Eglinton Avenue and Lebovic and Hakimi Avenues. It is scheduled to open in 2023.

Location
The stop is located in the middle of Eglinton Avenue East at its intersection with Lebovic and Hakimi Avenues. The stop has side platforms on the far side of the signalized intersection in either direction. This staggered configuration means the westbound platform is located west of the intersection, and the eastbound platform is situated east of the intersection. Between this stop and the Pharmacy stop to the west, there are two separate crossovers, one facing point and the other trailing point.

History
During the planning stages for Line 5 Eglinton, the stop was given the working name "Lebovic" after Lebovic Avenue, a street running south from Eglinton Avenue. However, on November 23, 2015, the TTC Board requested that Metrolinx change the name of the stop to "Hakimi" after Hakimi Avenue, a street running north from the same intersection. The TTC and local politicians felt that "Hakimi" was the better choice as that street leads to the prominent locations of Centennial College and Ashtonbee Reservoir Park. This led to much debate as there were still vocal supporters of the original Lebovic name. On January 15, 2016, as a compromise, the Metrolinx board of directors decided to make "Hakimi Lebovic" the name of the stop. Metrolinx later honoured the businessmen, Joe Lebovic and Karim Hakimi, for whom the stop (and associated streets) were named.

Surface connections 

, the following are the proposed connecting routes that would serve this station when Line 5 Eglinton opens:

References

External links

Line 5 Eglinton stations